The Amethyst-class corvettes were a class of the last wooden warships to be built for the British Royal Navy; each was built at a Royal Dockyard. Three were ordered under the 1871-72 Programme and two under the 1872-73 Programme. Built in the early and middle 1870s, they mostly served overseas and were retired early as they were regarded as hopelessly obsolete by the late 1880s.

Design
Unlike earlier wooden corvettes in the Navy, they had clipper bows (like the earlier Amazon Class sloops), while the last two had frigate sterns. All were initially ship-rigged (except for Encounter, which was barque-rigged), but after their first commission the Modeste, Diamond and Sapphire (but not Amethyst) were re-rigged as barques. They were completed with fourteen 64-pdr guns, of which twelve were truck-mounted on the broadsides and two were on rotating slides as bow and stern chasers. The guns were 64 cwt in the first three ships and 71 cwt in the last two.

Ships

Footnotes

Bibliography

 

Corvettes of the Royal Navy
Victorian-era corvettes of the United Kingdom